Steven Andrew Kilburn (born 31 January 1963) is an Australian politician who was a Labor Party member of the Legislative Assembly of Queensland from 2009  to 2012, representing the seat of Chatsworth.

Born in Brisbane, he served in the navy (1980–89) full-time, and then in the Navy Reserve (1992–2009), receiving a Defence Service Medal. He was a firefighter before entering politics.

References

1963 births
Living people
Members of the Queensland Legislative Assembly
Australian Labor Party members of the Parliament of Queensland
21st-century Australian politicians